Morbid was a Swedish thrash metal band from Stockholm that formed in 1986.

Biography
Morbid was formed in Stockholm at the end of 1986. With Per "Dead" Ohlin as the group's founder and leader, there was a number of members before the band settled on the line-up of John "John Lennart" Hagström, "TG" on guitars, Jens Näsström on bass and Lars-Göran Petrov on drums. When "TG" left the band, he was replaced by Ulf Cederlund. The band then recorded their debut demo, December Moon, at Thunderload Studios in Stockholm on 5 and 6 December 1987. This was the only recording featuring this line-up, as Hagström quit and Ohlin left for Norway to join the black metal band Mayhem. The remains of the band tried to carry on, and brought in photographer John Scarisbrick as a new vocalist. Scarisbrick lived near a recording studio named Sunlight, which would later gain some notoriety in death metal circles, recording bands like Entombed and Dismember. It was there that the band recorded their last release, a demo titled The Last Supper, in September 1988. The band faded as Petrov and Cederlund started Nihilist, which eventually turned into Entombed. Näsström later continued in the bands Contras and Skull.

Legacy
Although Morbid only officially released two demos, they gained a certain cult status after their break-up, in part likely to Ohlin's efforts with Mayhem. The demo recordings and various live and rehearsal tracks were later published on vinyl and CD, on official and bootleg releases. After Ohlin left the band to move to Kråkstad, he was replaced by the former singer, John Scarisbrick.

Members

Final members
 Necrobird – vocals (2022-2023)
 Ulf "Uffe" Cederlund (as Napoleon Pukes) – guitars (1987–1988, 2022-2023)
 John Hagström (as Gehenna) – guitars (1985–1988, 2022-2023)
 Torbjörn Gräslund (as TG) – guitars (1987, 2022-2023)
 Jens Näsström (as Dr. Schitz) – bass (1986–1988, 2022-2023)
 E – drums (2022-2023)

Former members
 Johan Scarisbrick – vocals (1988)
 Lars-Göran Petrov (as Drutten) – drums (1987–1988)
 Zoran Jovanovic – guitars (1988)
 Per "Dead" Ohlin – lead vocals (1985–1988)
 Slator – Bass (1985–1986)
 Francesco Sandro Lauri Cajander – drums (1985–1986)
 Marcus Klack (as Klacke) – guitars (1986–1987)

Timeline

Discography
 Rehearsal 07/08/1987 (demo, 1987)
 December Moon (demo, 1987)
 Last Supper (demo, 1988)
 December Moon (EP, 1994)
 Death Execution (compilation, 1995)
 Live in Stockholm (LP, Reaper, 2000)
 Death Execution III (7", Reaper, 2001)
 Year of the Goat (compilation, Century Media, 2011)
 Internet Baby (Feature (SkyeSyzed), 2021)

References

Works cited

1986 establishments in Sweden
1988 disestablishments in Sweden
Swedish black metal musical groups
Swedish death metal musical groups
Swedish thrash metal musical groups
Musical groups established in 1986
Musical groups disestablished in 1988